Yvon Poitras (born July 13, 1948) is a Canadian businessman, politician and lobbyist. He served as the Minister of Municipal Affairs of New Brunswick for 3 years, as well as Treasury Board chairman for two until 1985 under Premier Richard Hatfield.

Poitras was born in Grand Falls, New Brunswick. He currently is general manager of the New Brunswick Maple Syrup Association.

References

1948 births
Canadian lobbyists
Living people
Members of the Executive Council of New Brunswick
People from Grand Falls, New Brunswick
Progressive Conservative Party of New Brunswick MLAs